Moti Masjid (Punjabi), one of the "Pearl Mosques", is a 17th-century religious building located inside the Lahore Fort, Lahore, Punjab, Pakistan. It is a small, white marble structure built by Mughal emperor Jahangir and modified by the architects of Shah Jahan, and is among his prominent extensions (such as Sheesh Mahal and Naulakha pavilion) to the Lahore Fort Complex. The mosque is located on the western side of Lahore Fort, closer to Alamgiri Gate, the main entrance.

Etymology 

Moti in Urdu language means pearl, which designates a perceived preciousness to the religious structure. It was an established practice among Mughal emperors to name the mosques after generic names for gemstones. Other such examples are the Mina Masjid (Gem Mosque) and Nagina Masjid (Jewel Mosque), both located in Agra Fort and completed in 1637 under Shah Jahan's reign. The mosque, built between 1630 and 1635, is the first among the "pearl" named mosques, the others built by Shah Jahan in Agra Fort (1647–53), and his son Aurangzeb in the Red Fort (1659–60).

Subsequent history 
After the Mughal Empire, the mosque was converted into a Sikh temple and renamed Moti Mandir during the period of the Sikh rule under Ranjit Singh's Sikh Confederacy (1760–99). Later, Ranjit Singh also used the building for the state treasury. After the demise of Sikh Empire, when the British took over Punjab in 1849, they discovered precious stones wrapped in bits of rags and placed in velvet purses scattered inside the mosque, along with other inventory. The building was later revived to its former status, and the religious relics were conserved at the nearby Badshahi Mosque.

Design 
The structure, located in the northwestern corner of Dewan-e-Aam quadrangle, is typical of Mughal architecture of Shah Jahan's times. It is completely built of white marble that was brought from Makrana. The façade is composed of cusped arches and engaged baluster columns with smooth and fine contours. The mosque has three superimposed domes, two aisles of five bays, and a slightly raised central pishtaq, or portal with a rectangular frame. This five-arched facade distinguishes it from other mosques of the similar class with three-arched facades. The interior is simple and plain with the exception of ceilings that are decorated and designed in four different orders, two arcuate, and two trabeated.

Notes

See also 
 List of mosques in Pakistan
 Badshahi Mosque
 Naulakha pavilion
 Shalimar Gardens
 Sheesh Mahal
 Walled City of Lahore

References 
 Asher, Catherine E G (1992) Architecture of Mughal India. Cambridge University Press. 
 Koch, Ebba (1982) The Baluster Column: A European Motif in Mughal Architecture and Its Meaning. Journal of the Warburg and Courtauld Institutes, Vol. 45, p. 251-262 
 Koch, Ebba (1991). Mughal Architecture: An Outline of Its History and Development, 1526–1858. Prestel. 
 Nadiem, Ihsan H. (2004). Forts of Pakistan. Al-Faisal Publishers. 
 Nath, Ravinder (1982). History of Mughal Architecture. Abhinav Publications.

External links 

 Digital Library of Moti Masjid at ArchNet.

Religious buildings and structures completed in 1635
Lahore Fort
Mosques in Lahore
World Heritage Sites in Pakistan
1635 establishments in Asia
Mughal mosques